Bev Scott (30 September 1914 – 27 October 1998) was an Australian wrestler. He competed in the men's freestyle welterweight at the 1952 Summer Olympics.

References

1914 births
1998 deaths
Australian male sport wrestlers
Olympic wrestlers of Australia
Wrestlers at the 1952 Summer Olympics
Sportsmen from Tasmania